Adampur Assembly constituency in Hisar district is one of the 90 Vidhan Sabha constituencies of Haryana state in northern India. It is one of the nine assembly segments which make up Hisar Lok Sabha constituency.

Members of Assembly

^ bypoll

Election Results

2022 
Kuldeep Bishnoi resigned from the assembly seat in August 2022 and joined BJP. As a result a by-poll was necessitated.

2019

2014

See also
 List of constituencies of the Haryana Legislative Assembly
 Hisar district

References

External links
 Chief Election Officer, Haryana

Assembly constituencies of Haryana
Hisar district